Elsey Run is a stream in the U.S. state of West Virginia.

Elsey Run was perhaps named after Nicholas Elsey, a settler.

See also
List of rivers of West Virginia

References

Rivers of Preston County, West Virginia
Rivers of West Virginia